Heinrich-Heine-Allee is an underground light rail interchange station in Düsseldorf and is of particular importance because it is the only station to be served by all lines of the Düsseldorf Stadtbahn. The station lies on Heinrich-Heine-Allee in the district of Altstadt.

The station was opened in 1988 and extended in 2016. It consists of a mezzanine and two platform levels. The upper platform level has two island platforms serving four tracks, while the lower level has one island platform and two tracks.

External links 

 

Düsseldorf VRR stations
Railway stations in Germany opened in 1988